"Life as We Knew It" is a song written by Walter Carter and Fred Koller, and recorded by American country music artist Kathy Mattea.  It was released in November 1988 as the fourth single from the album Untasted Honey.  The song reached #4 on the Billboard Hot Country Singles & Tracks chart.

Chart performance

Year-end charts

References

1989 singles
Kathy Mattea songs
Songs written by Fred Koller
Song recordings produced by Allen Reynolds
Mercury Records singles
1988 songs